Stig Tore Svee (born 16 December 1963) is a Norwegian ice sledge hockey player.

As a member of the Norwegian ice sledge hockey team he has two silver (2002, 2006) from the Paralympic Games. At the 1998 Paralympic Games the team took the gold medal. He took the bronze medal with the Norwegian team at the 2010 Winter Paralympics in Vancouver, British Columbia, Canada.

References

External links
 

1963 births
Living people
Paralympic sledge hockey players of Norway
Norwegian sledge hockey players
Ice sledge hockey players at the 1998 Winter Paralympics
Ice sledge hockey players at the 2002 Winter Paralympics
Ice sledge hockey players at the 2006 Winter Paralympics
Ice sledge hockey players at the 2010 Winter Paralympics
Paralympic gold medalists for Norway
Paralympic silver medalists for Norway
Paralympic bronze medalists for Norway
Medalists at the 1998 Winter Paralympics
Medalists at the 2002 Winter Paralympics
Medalists at the 2006 Winter Paralympics
Medalists at the 2010 Winter Paralympics
Paralympic medalists in sledge hockey
Sportspeople from Trondheim